Manjhee (also spelled Manjhi) is a village in Degana tehsil, Nagaur district in the Indian state of Rajasthan. As of the 2011 Census of India, it has a population of 3,304, with 1,651 males and 1,653 females. 

It is located 14 km away from degana tehsil and 81 km from its district Nagaur.

Education:
Govt. senior secondary school manjhee
krishna bal niketan school manjhee
ranabai school manjhee
govt. secondary school regaro ki basti, manjhee

Gotra
1. Gugarwal
2. Beniwal
3. Sinwar
4. Jakhar
5. Prajapat
6. sharma
7. Sen
8. Rinwa
9. Regar
10. Meghwal
11. Rajput

References 

Villages in Nagaur district